Giustino Fortunato (4 September 1848 – 23 July 1932) was an Italian historian and politician.

Biography
He was born in Rionero in Vulture (Basilicata), from a bourgeois family. His great-uncle Giustino Fortunato (1777-1862) was the prime minister of the Kingdom of the Two Sicilies from 1849 to 1852. Fortunato studied at the Jesuit College and then studied law at the university in Naples. After the degree, he founded the journals Unità Nazionale and Patria. In May 1880, he was elected to the Italian Chamber of Deputies. 

Fortunato, along with other politician like Pasquale Villari, Francesco Saverio Nitti, Gaetano Salvemini formed a group of socio-political thinker called “meridionalisti” (“southernists”), in order to solve the economic problems of southern Italy after the Italian unification. Fortunato and others made the strong claim that the economic policies of the central government of the new state discriminated against the interests of the south while favoring those of north.

In his last years he moved away from his native country because of misunderstanding of his fellow citizens and two incidents that showed the ingratitude of the people, such as in 1917, when he was stabbed by a farmer in Rionero, which accused him of having supported the war. Fortunato died in Naples at the age of 83.

Works 
Ricordi di Napoli, Milano, Treves, (1874).
I Napoletani del 1799, Firenze, G. Barbèra, (1884).
Santa Maria di Vitalba, Trani, V. Vecchi, (1898).
Rionero medievale, Trani, V. Vecchi, (1899).
Notizie storiche della Valle di Vitalba, 6 voll., Trani, V. Vecchi, (1898–1904).
Il Mezzogiorno e lo Stato italiano. Discorsi politici, 1880-1910, 2 voll., Bari, Laterza, (1911).
Pagine e ricordi parlamentari, I, Bari, Laterza, 1920; II, Firenze, A. Vallecchi, (1927).
Riccardo da Venosa e il suo tempo, Trani, Vecchi e C., (1918).
Rileggendo Orazio, in "Nuova Antologia", (1924).
Le strade ferrate dell'Ofanto, 1880-97, Firenze, Vallecchi, (1927).
Carteggio tra Giustino Fortunato e Umberto Zanotti-Bianco, Roma, Collezione meridionale editrice, (1972).
Carteggio, Roma-Bari, Laterza, (1978–1981).
Giustino Fortunato e il Senato. Carteggio, 1909-1930, Soveria Mannelli, Rubbettino, (2003).

Honors 
 Order of Saints Maurice and Lazarus, Commander, 1891

References

External links
Biography of Giustino Fortunato

People from Rionero in Vulture
1932 deaths
1848 births